Darna is a Filipina superheroine created by writer Mars Ravelo and artist Nestor Redondo. The character's first appearance was in Pilipino Komiks (Ace Publications, Inc.) #77 on May 13, 1950. Darna is a retooling of Ravelo's earlier character, Varga, whose stories he wrote and illustrated himself. This character first appeared in Bulaklak Magazine, Volume 4, #17 on July 23, 1947. Ravelo left the Bulaklak Magazine publications due to differences with the publication's editors. One of the most popular Filipino superheroes, Darna has appeared in many films and several television series through the decades which have far overshadowed her actual comics tenure.

The 2003 Mango Comics miniseries revealed that Darna is a deceased extraterrestrial warrior magically manifesting herself through a woman from Earth named Narda who summons her by shouting her name. As Darna, she stands up for those who cannot fend for themselves. She fights against common criminals as well as greater forces of evil, most famously the snake-haired supervillain Valentina. She is often accompanied by her younger brother, Ding. Several alternate versions of Darna have been characterized over the years.

Darna's appearance is distinctive and iconic: she usually wears a red bikini or shorts with a gold star in each brassiere cap; red helmet with ruby encrusted gold winged medallion; gold bracelets; a golden medallion belt with a loincloth in the middle; and red boots. Darna is widely considered as a Filipino cultural icon and the most celebrated superhero character in the Philippines.

The character has been adapted extensively and portrayed in other forms of media as well, including films and television series. Several actresses have portrayed Darna in motion pictures and TV series including Rosa del Rosario, Liza Moreno, Eva Montes, Gina Pareño, Vilma Santos, Lorna Tolentino, Rio Locsin, Sharon Cuneta, Nanette Medved, Anjanette Abayari, Regine Velasquez, Angel Locsin, Marian Rivera, Iza Calzado and Jane De Leon.

Character history

Early years
Mars Ravelo created the first images of Darna before World War II, as the character's predecessor Varga. Ravelo's inspiration for Darna's heroic qualities came from a fascination with Jerry Siegel and Joe Shuster's Superman. The winged medallion on Darna's helmet was inspired by the emblem of the Philippine airforce as Ravelo also dreamed of the opportunity to fly. The magic white stone concept is cultural iconography as Philippine folklore has many stories of brave young mortals whose courage and heart enable them to be worthy of magic amulets - the only thing in these stories that could even the odds against evil, supernatural forces.

After the war, Ravelo realized that the Filipinos were in need of a superhero so he again shopped his superheroine concept to publishers until one of them, Bulaklak Komiks agreed to publish Ravelo's heroine that he now called "Varga" in 1947 (inspired by the Varga girls series of illustrations) and the strip took off. Varga made her debut in Bulaklak Magazine, Vol. 4, #17 on July 23, 1947, which Ravelo wrote and drew. In an interview, Ravelo revealed that he offered his creation first to Liwayway Magazine and other publications but was rejected. Had Liwayway Magazine not rejected the offer, Varga would have been the Philippines' first komiks superhero.

Contrary to popular belief, Darna was not named after the magical Ibong Adarna (Adarna bird), which appears in a Philippine epic of the same name. In Bulaklak Magazine, Narda was already established as Varga's mortal identity. "Darna" was simply an anagram of "Narda". The concept and image of the character was based on the illustrations of Superman appearing on comic books brought by soldiers from the United States to the Philippines. It was the story of a mortal girl named Narda (named after one of Ravelo's childhood playmates), her brother Ding and their grandmother, Lola Asay, who lived in the town of Masambong when a falling star revealed itself to be a magic amulet that turns Narda into the superheroine Varga.

The name Varga was under ownership of Bulaklak Komiks. Darna's first adventure was first serialized in the pages of Pilipino Komiks (Ace Publications, Inc.) #77 on May 13, 1950, where she was pitted against the sultry snake goddess, Valentina. Here, Narda, a young girl, swallows a stone, which has the word "Darna" on it, and transforms into Darna by shouting out the latter's name. Likewise, Darna turns back into Narda by shouting Narda's name. The stone, which was from the planet Marte, stays in her body. Her secret is known to her grandmother and her brother, Ding, who becomes her sidekick. Darna quickly gained popularity among Filipino comic book readers. The original Darna comics series, written by Ravelo and illustrated by Redondo, ran for 28 issues.

Later years
On May 31, 1951, Darna made a crossover from comics to cinema even before the comic book serial was finished. Royal Publications under Fernando Poe Sr. produced the first Darna film starring Rosa Del Rosario as Narda/Darna. It was the last film directed by Fernando Poe Sr. Since then, a number of actresses and actors have portrayed the superheroine on both cinema and television. Some made from 1973 onwards starred the future multi-awarded dramatic actress and politician Vilma Santos. In this incarnation, Darna's origin was changed. Narda herself became Darna, unlike the original in which she just "channeled" her. The stone came out of Narda's mouth every time she changes back and she had to swallow it every time she wanted to transform (a revision that became the standard for the following incarnations). Darna is not specified as coming from Marte and is mentioned simply as a "Warrior of Light". In this version, Narda was aged up from a child to her early teens, and only Ding was aware of her secret. This version of Darna became most people's idea of the character for about 3 decades. A catchphrase popularized by the films and said by Narda runs, "Ding, ang bato!" ("Ding, [give me] the stone!")

In 1977, the first Darna TV series was produced by Kitchie Benedicto and aired on RPN (KBS-9). Darna! The TV Series starred Lorna Tolentino as Darna/Narda. Darna also had her own cartoon series in 1986 aired on GMA Network.

The Mango Comics miniseries
In 2003, a National Book Award-winning Darna limited miniseries was published by Mango Comics, with major input from Ravelo's family. DARNA is a three-part 50th Anniversary Issue (36 pages per issue, full-color, in English). The first part of the series was released on February 28, 2003, the second part on May 7, 2003, and the last part on December 13, 2003. With an all-new storyline of Bobby Yonzon and each issue drawn by a different, world-class artist, every one of this series is guaranteed to satisfy.

DARNA Issue #1: Darna finds herself faced with a familiar serpent-coiffed adversary who's sexier and deadlier than ever. Written by Boboy Yonzon, pencils by Ryan Orosco and inks by Gilbert Monsanto.

DARNA Issue #2:

DARNA Issue #3: Written by Boboy Yonzon, pencils and inks by Gilbert Monsanto.

Fictional character biography
The story of Darna begins with a village girl named Narda who lives in the provincial town Barrio Masambong with her brother Ding. The siblings were orphaned and consequently adopted by their grandmother Lola Asay.

Narda loves to sing while her younger brother, Ding, plays the harmonica very well. Sometimes, Narda and Ding go from house to house and sing for the money to help their grandmother to support their daily needs.

While playing a game of "Hide and Seek" one night, Narda saw a shooting star in the night sky. The celestial object crashed into woods. Impressed by its beauty, she picked it up and decided to keep it. When her playmates started looking for her, she immediately hid the white stone in her mouth to prevent her playmates from taking it from her.
 
The white stone came alive and went down her throat into her stomach. She began to experience psychic flashes that flooded her mind with alien images of worlds far away which caused her to fall unconscious. She was found by Lola Asay, who took her home and put her to bed.

When Narda woke up, she was back at home with her grandmother and her brother, Ding. They asked her what happened and she related her bizarre experience. When her grandmother asked her what the inscription was on the white stone she swallowed, Narda yelled ... "DARNA!"
 
Her grandmother and brother were both startled by a flash of light and smoke that filled the room. Where Narda once stood, there now was a tall, beautiful warrior woman. She explained to them that she was "Darna of the Planet Marte" and that she was sent to Earth to face the forces of darkness and hatred that afflicted the world. Narda was channeling the alien woman. After she assured them that she meant no harm, Darna changed back to Narda by saying the latter's name.

Alter egos

Narda
Regardless of its many incarnations, the story of Darna begins with a village girl named Narda who finds a small white stone, a tiny meteorite from outer space. Narda swallows the stone and shouts "Darna," she becomes a mighty warrior ready to defend Earth from evil forces.

In the 2009 TV series, Darna's alter ego was named Narda Arcanghel—her surname being a possible nod to archangel, God's messenger; Father Mateo (played by Eddie Garcia) also referred to Darna as "Anghel na Sugo ng Langit".

Daria
Mars Ravelo created a second alter-ego named Daria in "Si Darna at Planetman" serialized in Holiday Komiks in 1969. For the first time, Darna transformed into Daria in the third issue of Si Darna at ang Planetman. Daria is a grown up version of Narda. In the 1969 film Darna at ang Planetman, Gina Pareño played Darna and Daria; she was the only actress to portray Darna's alter-ego Daria.

Nemeses
Darna faces a variety of foes ranging from common criminals to outlandish supervillains, often having tragic origin stories that lead them to a life of crime and evil. Valentina is the most iconic Filipino super-villain created by Mars Ravelo. If you have Darna, Valentina will eventually strike. Darna's other long-time recurring foes include Babaeng Lawin, Babaeng Impakta, Babaeng Tuod, and Babaeng Linta, among others. Many of Darna's adversaries are often women.

Golden Age

Valentina
Valentina (goddess of the snakes/serpents) is the most popular enemy of Darna in the comics, films and television. She envies Narda and never appreciates what is her own; she torments her and becomes the cause of most of her misfortunes. She can control all kinds of snakes being from the same race as the Serpent Queens of Tiamat. In most incarnations, she has snakes on her head which she hides under a wig like the Gorgon Medusa.

Cristina Aragon was the first to play Valentina on the big screen opposite the first Darna, Rosa del Rosario in Darna (1951). Celia Rodriguez played Babaing Ahas in Lipad, Darna, Lipad! (1973). Pilar Pilapil played the role in Darna (1991). Pilita Corrales played Valentina in Mars Ravelo's Darna! Ang Pagbabalik (1994).

As Darna flew to the small screen so did Valentina. In Darna (2005), Alessandra De Rossi played the first TV Valentina followed by Iwa Moto in Darna (2009).

In Darna (2022 TV series), she is portrayed by Janella Salvador.

Babaeng Lawin
Babaeng Lawin appeared in Pilipino Komiks' Darna at ang Babaing Lawin (1951). She was born with superhuman strength and agility in the comics.

Elvira Reyes played the first Babaing Lawin/Armida on the big screen in Darna at ang Babaing Lawin (1952). Liza Lorena played the role in Lipad, Darna, Lipad! (1973) then Veronica Jones in Darna at Ding (1980).

But in the 2009 TV series, Babaeng Lawin (Armida the Robotic Hawk Woman), played by Ehra Madrigal, has enhanced strength, endurance, durability, speed and healing after being experimented on.

Babaeng Impakta
Babaeng Impakta is another classic Darna villainess that was updated in the 2009 TV series. She appeared in Kenkoy Komiks' Darna at ang Impakta (1962). Babaeng Impakta is actually a pair of conjoined twins—Roma and her impish twin. Roma was first played by Gina Alonzo and Paquito Salcedo played the demonic conjoined twin on the big screen in Si Darna at ang Impakta (1963). Gloria Romero played Babaeng Impakta in Lipad, Darna, Lipad! (1973). Impakta was played by Bing Loyzaga in Darna (1991). Nadine Samonte was Roma and Mura was her twin Impy in the 2009 TV series.

Roma who was born to a prominent family appears like a normal human with an angelic face and a sweet demeanor but her back is grotesquely humped.

Isputnik
Nida Blanca played Darna's rival superheroine, Isputnik, in Isputnik vs. Darna (1963).

Babaeng Tuod
Babaeng Tuod appeared in Liwayway Magazine's Darna at ang Babaing Tuod (1964). Babaeng Tuod/Lucy was first played on the big screen by Gina Alonzo in Darna at ang Babaing Tuod (1965). Alonzo previously played Roma ang Babaeng Impakta in Si Darna at ang Impakta (1963). Francine Prieto, who played the young Narda in Darna (1991) but was uncredited, played Babaeng Tuod/Lucifera in the 2009 TV series.

Babaeng Tuod (Lucifera the Wood Witch; Lucifera, the Tree Monster) is the embodiment of nature as she is a living tree.

Planetman
Planetman appeared in Holiday Komiks-Magasin's Darna at ang Planetman (1968). Vic Vargas played the Planetman in Si Darna at ang Planetman (1969).

Babaeng Linta
Babaeng Linta first appeared in Darna Komiks-Magasin's Darna at ang Babaing Linta #1 (February 3, 1968).

Babaeng Linta (Leech Woman) has two alter egos: Octavia Moran, a 1940s actress and Lutgarda Morales, an actress and model in 2009. Babaeng Linta got her powers from a lake infested with leeches. Octavia used her newfound abilities to wreak vengeance upon the men that molested her, one of which was Adolfo Sandejas, Pancho's (played by Dennis Trillo) grandfather.

Binibining Pilipinas World 2007 Maggie Wilson played the role in the 2009 TV series.

Giants
In Darna and the Giants (1973), the giants were played by Divina Valencia, Ike Lozada, Pepito Rodriguez, Cesar Ramirez, Zandro Zamora and Max Alvarado. In Darna at Ding (1980), Max Alvarado also played the Giant.

X-3-X
Helen Gamboa played the alien warrior queen X-3-X in Darna and the Giants (1973).

Elektra
Rosanna Ortiz played Elektra in Darna vs. the Planet Women (1975).

Regine Velasquez, who previously had a cameo as Darna in the 2003 film Captain Barbell, played Elektra (Reyna ng mga Amasona) in the 2009 TV series.

The Planet Women
In Darna and the Giants (1973), the Planet Women were played by Lorelei, Elizabeth Vaughn, Karina Zawalski, Anita Lincoln, Cristy Soriano and Lorna Locsin. There were also Planet Men in the film who were played by Ricky Valencia, Karlo Vero, Dave Esguerra, Robert Miller, and Greg Lozano (uncredited).

In Darna vs the Planet Women (1975), Lita Vasquez played Kara, the Planet woman, while the other Planet women were played by Diana Villa and Lieza Zobel.

Lei Ming
Celia Rodriguez, who previously played Babaeng Ahas in Lipad, Darna, Lipad! (1973), played an evil witch named Lei Ming in Darna at Ding (1980).

Dr. Vontesberg
Marissa Delgado played Dr. Vontesberg in Darna at Ding (1980).

Satanina Dayabolika
Satanina Dayabolika appeared in Kampeon Komiks' Darna Versus Santanina Dayabolika (1977).

Black Widow
Black Widow appeared in Ravelo Magazine's Darna at ang Black Widow (February 14, 1980).

Black Orchid

Dyangga
Dyangga appeared in Darna Komiks' Darna vs. Dyangga (January 21, 1985). Alice Dixson had a cameo as Dyangga in the 2005 TV series. Dixson played another Ravelo creation, Dyesebel in the 1990 film of the same name. But in the series, it was Ara Mina who portrayed Dyesebel for a cameo.

Taong Diablo
Taong Diablo appeared in Darna at ang Taong Diablo (November 11, 1985).

Modern Age (1986-present)

Taong Ibon
Taong Ibon appeared in Darna Komiks Magasin's Darna at ang Taong Ibon (October 12, 1987).

The Warlock
The Warlock appeared in Darna Komiks' Darna vs. the Warlock (June 25, 1990).

Valentine
Valentine Adan is Valentina's daughter. Cherie Gil played Valentine in Mars Ravelo's Darna! Ang Pagbabalik (1994). She is often confused as Valentina who was played by Pilita Corrales. Like Valentina and Medusa, she has snakes on her head.

Dominico Lipolico
Edu Manzano played Dominico Lipolico in Darna 1991 and Mars Ravelo's Darna! Ang Pagbabalik (1994).

Magnum
Bong Alvarez played Magnum in Mars Ravelo's Darna! Ang Pagbabalik (1994)

Zumarna
Zumarna appeared in Darna Komiks' Darna vs. Zumarna (1992).

Black Mercury
Black Mercury appeared in Darna Komiks' Darna vs. the Black Mercury (1994).

Araknido
Araknido appeared in Darna Komiks Magazine's Darna vs. Araknido (August 12, 1996).

Toxic Monster
Toxic Monster appeared in Super Action Komiks' Darna at ang Toxic Monster (1999).

Devil Dinosaur

Mirca
Mirca first appeared in Super Action Vol. 2 #12 Paano Kung May Tatlong Darna? (1999), a retelling of Darna's origin; it turns out that the magic stone Narda saw fall from the sky was only one of three. Carmi is an orphan who founds the second stone landing somewhere in Europe and with the stone's power, she becomes the heroine Mirca who sells her services to the highest bidder.

Ion
Ion is a strange reptile-like alien creature who first appeared in Super Action Vol. 2 #12 Paano Kung May Tatlong Darna? (1999). He holds the third stone and assumes a human disguise as Oni Basilisk, the head of the weapons manufacturing firm Kran Industries.

Ebony

China
She rarely assumes her full serpentine form compared to Ebony and prefers to utilize her humanoid reptilian form complete with legs.

Mambabarang
Mambabarang (Lord of Insects and Pests) wreaks havoc in society with his insects and pests. Eddie Garcia played Mambabarang in the 2005 TV series.

Dr. Zombie
Dr. Zombie (Mad Scientist/Re-Animator of corpses) invented a concoction to cure his wife (played by Rio Locsin) from end-stage cancer but was too late to cure her. His life took a twisted turn after the death of his beloved wife. His concoction had the power to reanimate the dead-into zombies. He also wields an assortment of weaponry unique only to himself. Christopher de Leon played Dr. Zombie/Ted in the 2005 TV series.

Braguda
Braguda, the Queen of Darkness and ruler of the Anomalkas (Planet Marte's evil underground dwelling race), is the main villain of the 2005 TV series. She is the powerful queen of the Anomalkan race of the Planet Marte who dreams of the whole galaxy bowing down to her but for that to happen, she must obtain Darna's white stone and merge it with her black stone so that she may transform the Planet Earth into a new version of the Planet Marte. Celia Rodriguez, who previously played two different Darna villains: Babaing Ahas in Lipad, Darna, Lipad! (1973) and Lei Ming in Darna at Ding (1980), played Braguda in the 2005 TV series; she went on to play Ms. Perfecta in the 2009 TV series.

Sulfura
Sulfura (Human Volcano) has the power to fly, and spew fire, rocks and acid to melt her enemies. Carmina Villarroel played Sulfura.

Nosferamus
Nosferamus, a super being like the Grim Reaper, is the right-hand man of Braguda. He is the transformed form of Narda's father who she thought is dead. His powers include being able to dissolve into a black mist, summon blasts of dark-red energy, and conjure a lump of molten metal which he flung at Darna's eyes, blinding the superheroine. He died when he sacrificed his life for his daughter. Tonton Gutierrez played Nosferamus/Mulong in the 2005 TV series.

Babaeng Lobo
Babaeng Lobo was played by Karen delos Reyes who also played as Alice, Babaeng Tuod and Babaeng Impakta in the 2005 TV series.

Black Darna
Black Darna/Carol first appeared in Darna (2005) and was played by Katrina Halili. She was the result of Darna's cooped up emotions; Darna's essence turned into a supervillain of equal strength and ability. Black Darna is one of the most formidable adversaries of Darna as she's also noticeably faster than her. Like Darna, her only weakness is that she draws her powers from the white stone.

Molecula
Molecula (Toxic Woman) is a shapeshifter who can break herself apart to a molecular level, splitting herself to countless, minute molecular parts to gain more mobility and versatility; she could also fling these particles at targets and trigger a dissolving effect, similar to corrosive acid, or coagulate them instantly. Cristine Reyes played Molecula in the 2005 TV series.

Divas Impaktitas
The Divas Impaktitas are the three right hand she-vampires of Valentina. They were created by the black stone, granting them immunity to the sun as well as crosses and crucifixes, though they could still be slain if something sharp like a stake is driven through their hearts. Ryza Cenon played Louella/Divas Impaktita in the 2005 TV series.

Divina Demonica
Divina Demonica has the power to scream supersonic screams that could give severe trauma to those within her vicinity. She also demonstrates the ability to manipulate bats. K Brosas played Divina Demonica in the 2005 TV series.

Toy Master
Toy Master is a clown who has the power to control toys as well as other abilities that border on the realm of magic, allowing him to defy the fabric of reality by summoning corporeal objects out of nothing or generating an irritating sound by beating his drum, powerful enough to disorient even Darna. He stole his magical powers from a gnome. Bearwin Meily played Toy Master in the 2005 TV series.

Manananggal

Trolka
Trolka is an Anomalkan warrior in the 2005 TV series.

Kobra
Paolo Contis played Kobra/Xandro ang "Hari ng Lipi ng mga Ahas" in the 2009 TV series. In the original comics version (1950), Kobra was a female. This form seems to give him the benefit of his snake form while giving him the ability to hold things with his clawed hands. He can also squish his opponents with his deadly coils. He was secretly Valentina's real father. He impregnated Roma ang Babaeng Impakta to bear him more of his serpentine race after seeing her in his cave and for the purpose of having an heir that will be more faithful to him than his other daughter, Valentina. He may be invulnerable to bullets but not from sharp objects.

Serpina
Serpina (Babaeng Anakonda), the princess of the snakes and Valentina's half-sister, was played by Katrina Halili in the 2009 TV series. Halili previously played Black Darna in 2005. Serpina is Kobra's daughter with Roma (Babaeng Impakta). She also uses a powerful staff as her weapon. She even has a psychic rapport with Valentina that allows them to communicate telepathically.

Vibora
Vibora is Valentina's loyal serpent.

Bazooka Gang
Shiro, played by Polo Ravales, is a local crime lord and the leader of the Bazooka Gang. Shiro abducted Armida/Babaeng Lawin and brought her to Dr. Danilo Morgan (Dr. Montgomery's grandson) to reattach her wings. Liberty, played by Krista Kleiner, is Shiro's lieutenant and possible girlfriend.

Babaeng Gagamba
Babaeng Gagamba (Secretary Rizza Miranda at the Hospicio residence)

Babaeng Demonyita
Jackie Rice played Helga Demonyita, a powerful witch who preys on innocent children, in the 2009 TV series. She was possessed by the devil and like it she is closed red, has horns on her forehead and a long tail which she uses as a whip. She has a hatred over humanity. She uses voodoo dolls and can also control fire. She is invulnerable to bullets. She can also vanish into fire.

Vladimir
Vladimir is a vampire who was played by Akihiro Sato in the 2009 TV series. He appears to be a tall, dark and handsome man as described by Francesca. Like any vampire, he cannot stand the sun.

Powers, abilities, and equipment
Through the course of the franchise and comic releases, Darna's original powers include the following:

 Olympic-level combat skills - Narda, without having any experiences or knowledge in combat, once transformed into Darna would have access to a wide array of fighting capabilities in order to combat her enemies.
 Flight - Darna has the ability to fly at great heights and above average speed.
 Enhanced Speed and Senses - Darna can enhance her movements and senses to be able to detect presence of other beings or objects. This also helps her be more effective in battle. Her enhanced speed could also be used in conjunction with her flying, to move at a faster speed. Her senses can be heightened, depending on her need.
 Superhuman Strength - Darna has access to enormous strength that could help her lift, throw, extremely heavy objects that is usually impossible for an average human can do. She can use this to break walls, or use heavy debris to throw at her enemy or to deal fatal damage on her enemies during combat.
 Nigh-invulnerability and Stamina - Darna's body is strengthen by unknown properties, to which enables her to withstand strong physical attack and causes her not to faint or lose consciousness right away after being thrown with incredible force. Though at times, this ability has limitations.

In Darna film starring Nanette Medved, her powers include, flight, enhanced speed, reflexes, and strength, and a bit of telepathy.

In Mars Ravelo's Darna! Ang Pagbabalik, her powers include enhanced strength, reflexes, speed, heat vision and flight.

In the 2003 retcon comic release, this was explained as due to her psionic background. A form of telekinesis enhances her speed and strength and allows her flight. Her skin has a high level of invulnerability because of her species. Her psionic abilities also allow her to exercise limited psionic influence or telepathy. For weapons, the ruby on her helmet augments her psionic abilities, allowing her to emit a powerful concussion blast and the medallions that make up her belt can be used like throwing stars (shuriken).

In the 2005 TV series, aside from strength, flight and enhanced senses, she also has heat vision lent by the ruby in hear headgear.

In the 2009 TV series, Darna's bracers can produce flames when Darna focuses her energy enough and cause friction by brushing both braces against each other.

In the 2022 TV Series, Darna's powers and abilities are superhuman speed, strength, and flight. Her combat skills were actually taught to her, giving the notion that the Stone doesn't give access to immediate expertise in hand-tohand-combat.

On many Darna series and movies, her bracers are one of the most used equipment in her arsenal, usually used as a shield or deflector against bullets, and even energy blasts.

The White Stone
The White Stone / The Stone (in Tagalog, "Ang Puting Bato", or simply "Ang Bato") is a pebble-sized meteorite containing unknown and powerful properties that grants numerous abilities to whoever wears or swallows it.

Narda transforms into Darna, and vice versa, by shouting out their respective names ("Darna" to become Darna, "Narda" to become Narda). First, however, Narda has to swallow the stone, which conveniently comes out of her mouth every time Darna changes back to Narda. It started in the 1973 film Lipad, Darna, Lipad! ("Fly, Darna, Fly"). However, it was not so in the comic book versions.

The stone's appearance usually takes form of a small soft white pebble/mineral that occasionally glows, usually when it is trying to convey something to its bearer. This can be theorized that the stone is also a sentient material capable of feeling and judgement. In Mars Ravelo's Darna! Ang Pagbabalik (1994), the stone was forcibly taken from Narda, and due to the altercation, she temporarily lost her sanity. Once she regained the stone, it projects memories of her as Darna though flashes of light, an effort of the White Stone to restore her mind into its rightful state.

Although the original comic book lore written by Mars Ravelo himself does not go into detail about the origins of the magic white stone (other than the Darna entity contained within came from the planet Marte), other iterations of Darna had their own explanation of how the magic white stone came to be. In the 1991 film, there is no origin for the stone, but it was shown that it could restore any serpentine-humanoid to its youth. The 1994 film version showed it came from heaven and it was given by an angel to Narda, because she will be the one who can stop the emissary of the Devil who will soon come to their world. In the 2022 TV series, the stone came from the planet Marte, as a gift to the most qualified individual, this was given to Zora (the first Darna) then was passed on to her half-human daughter, Narda.

The White Stone is one of the most coveted objects of the franchise, in movies and series, the White Stone was fought upon for its possession, mostly by the enemies, to use its power for world domination. In the 1991 movie, the Devil wants the stone instead of Darna presumably to use its power to increase its own. In the 1994 movie, the stone was stolen from Narda to use its power to restore Valentina to her youth. In the 2005 TV series, the White Stone in conjunction with the Black Stone are needed to access much devastating power. In the 2009 TV version, the enemies of the first Darna sought the stone to absorbed its powers, which they were successfully able to do temporarily, the abilities and powers were able to be regained by the new Darna after defeating them in their respective battles.

To add, a new theme in both 2009 and 2022 TV series were added, particularly the story where a new chosen individual will inherit the White Stone from the original Darna, basically becoming a tradition that when the world will need Darna, a new one will be chosen by the Stone to assume the mantle. In the 2009 version, Narda (Marian Rivera) was chosen by the stone to replace an unnamed mortal (goes by the name Gabay (in English: Guide)) who was the first Darna that appeared in the 1940s. In the 2022 version, the enemies of planet Marte sought the stone for its power, Zora/Darna fought the enemies, she escaped Marte and accidentally landed on Earth. The Stone eventually chooses her daughter to become the next Darna so Zora, known on Earth as Leonor, had no choice but to train her daughter in the art of combat so that she will be ready.

2009 TV (GMA) version
Little is known about Darna's origin, but the stone came from heaven like a meteorite until it is immediately found by a little girl named Narda, this storyline is actually similar to the 1991 version of the stone's origin, minus the vision of the Angel.

In the 2009 version, whoever inherits the stone and don the mantle of Darna will inherit the following abilities:

Superhuman strength - The ability to enhance the physical strength of its bearer to unimaginable scales. This ability can be used to jump in unusual high distances and can be used to lift extremely heavy objects etc. This is the original ability Darna that was retained after the four original antagonist tried to absorbed the power of the stone.
Superhuman senses - The ability to enhance one's own senses. With this, Darna can hear voices, even whispers from many feet away, her sense of smell, sight and feeling can also be heighten so she can detect most movements than an average human cannot.
Shield / Superhuman invulnerability - The White stone grants its bearer a strong defense barrier that can able to withstand strong attacks and blows. When Narda was a child(not taking Darna's form), the stone summoned a barrier that protected her from a bullet. Then another one is when Babaeng Tuod absorbed this ability, her external skin became near-invulnerable, strong similar to that of an iron steel. This ability were later regain by Darna. Overall, this ability is what helps Darna absorb and withstand heavy blows even explosions.
Ability absorption - The White Stone grants the ability to its bearer to copy the most recent ability used by an enemy. This ability was used by the Babaeng Linta to fight Darna.
Flight - The White stone grants the bearer the power to fly. This was later stolen by Babaeng Impakta but were later regain by Darna
Superhuman speed - The White stone grants the power of augment speed and agility to unimaginable scales. This was later absorbed by Babaeng Lawin but were later regain by Darna
Magic glamouring - Whoever swallows the stone and transformed into Darna, the human will retain her original body features such as facial and body built, but a magic aura will conceal the true form of the bearer, making it seemed like Darna is not sharing the same face as its bearer. Therefore, nobody can recognize Darna and the bearer as the same person.

Appearances

Costume
Darna's costume has varied over time, although almost all of her costume incarnations have retained some form of red bikini with a gold star on each brassiere cup, red headdress/helmet with a ruby set on a gold-winged ornament, gold bracelets, gold medallion belt with a loincloth, and near knee-high red boots.

Darna is a character that fused together the concept of a superhero with the traditions of Philippine folklore. The yellow/gold stars come from the Philippine flag, the loincloth (bahag) is a visual inspiration from native clothing, and the agimat come from Filipino folklore and superstition. Filipino folklore has a tradition of presenting humble, pure hearted mortals that are awarded amulets that allow them to (in a way) transform their virtues into superpowers that allow them to battle supernatural evil.

Variations in other media

1970s
Sine Pilipino got Vilma Santos to essay the role of Darna in Lipad, Darna, Lipad! (1973). But the problem was, Santos was hesitant to wear the two-piece costume. So, during their photo shoot for the publicity photos for the film, she wore the Darna costume on top of her body stocking. Directors told her if she did not take it off, they will give the role to someone else. Santos was finally convinced by producers Douglas Quijano and William Leary to lose the body stocking and wear just the costume on the day of the press conference. 
In Darna and the Giants (1974), Santos wore an all gold bikini top with red stars, boyshorts, helmet, belt with red loincloth, knee-high go-go boots, cuff bracelets and choker. She also wore a red cape to a dance.
In Darna vs. the Planetwomen (1975), Santos wore a dark blue bikini top with red stars, dark blue boyshorts, gold belt, and red loincloth, boots, bracelets and choker almost similar to Darna's costume in Pilipino Komiks Darna #99 (March 17, 1951), Pilipino Komiks Darna at ang Babaing Lawin #120 (January 5, 1952), Darna Komiks Darna at ang Taong Ibon #964 (October 12, 1967) and Darna Komiks Darna vs. Zumarna #1275 (September 27, 1993) except for the gold headpiece which is similar to her headpiece in Pilipino Komiks Darna #87 (September 30, 1950).

In 1977, Kitchie Benedicto of KBS-9 produced the first Darna TV series with then young actress Lorna Tolentino as Darna/Narda. Tolentino was the first to wear a one-piece costume with gold stars instead of the classic two-piece bikini. Another detail that changed in this version were Darna's accessories, instead of ruby, her red helmet had a large star in the middle of the gold winged medallion, and the gold belt had an even larger star in the middle. Her golden cuff bracelets also had a red lining. While her red thigh-high wedged boots had large gold star details.

In 1979, two Darna films were made. In the parody film Darna, Kuno? starring Dolphy, he wore an inflating red bikini top with gold dots surrounding the gold stars, all gold helmet, belt, cuff bracelets, and knee-high boots. Brenda Del Rio, a pregnant Darna, wore the two-piece costume as well. She had a red bikini top with gold star details on each brassiere caps, blue bottoms, and all gold headpiece with a winged medallion at the center, cuff bracelets, thigh-high boots, and belt minus the loincloth. After giving birth, Darna came back with her baby also dressed up as Darna. Lotis Key also put on the same costume as Del Rio. In Bira, Darna, Bira! starring Rio Locsin, she wore the classic red bikini with gold stars, red helmet with an encircled star in the middle of the gold winged medallion, bracelets with gold stars and red straps, red knee-high boots, star-filled medallion belt and short yellow loincloth with red details, with the addition of a gold-embellished red choker. This time, Ding, played by Romnick Sarmenta, also had his own superhero costume. He wore a red mask, long sleeve shirt and boots, and blue shorts.

1980s
Santos wore a shiny red bra with gold stars and chains, shiny blue shorts with white loincloth, and red and gold helmet with the gold winged medallion. Her bracelets, belt and boots were all-gold. This time, Ding (played by Niño Muhlach) also had his own superhero costume together with his own superpowers. He wore red long-sleeved leotard and boots, and red helmet with gold winged medallion.

In a cameo role in Viva Films' Captain Barbell (1986), Sharon Cuneta appeared as Darna. She wore a red and blue one-piece with gold stars—the top part was red while the bottom was blue and the stomach area had red and blue stripes. For the first time, Darna's red helmet had a transparent wing with ruby encrusted gold medallion in the middle. She also donned a ruby encrusted gold medallion belt with red loincloth, and red knee-high boots. Her gold cuff bracelets were encrusted with star-shaped rubies.

1990s
In the 1991 film Darna, produced by Viva Films, Nanette Medved wore a red bikini top with gold stars.

Instead of wings on the ruby-encrusted tiara, this Darna had two golden leaves entwined for a headpiece. The costume was still a red bikini with the gold stars now adorned with red crystals at the center. Like Medved's Darna, Abayari wore a high-cut panty. The bracelets remained gold; the gold belt was a bit different, it had a large buckle but still with a red loincloth, and the boots had gold details in them. However, the Ravelos and majority of fans wish to preserve Darna's signature look with a few design tweaks here and there from time to time.

Darna made another cameo this time in a series of Toyota Tamaraw FX commercials in 1997, with Anjanette Abayari, portraying Darna.

Lisa Macuja in Komiks CCP Ballet as Darna (1997) wore a red and turquoise sleeveless leotard (the stomach portion was white in color) with yellow stars, red helmet with yellow winged medallion, yellow belt with black loincloth, and yellow ballerina shoes.

In one of the issues by Super Action Komiks, Darna was illustrated differently. This time she's wearing a chest and stomach-bearing red-trimmed blue one-piece with red shoulder pads, ruby encrusted gold winged medallion tiara, blue bracelets and belt, blue knee guards with yellow wings, and red boots.

In an episode of Dolphy's sitcom Home Along da Riles, Babalu's character Mang Ritchie once wore a Darna costume. He wore a gold headband, red bra with gold stars, red shorts, and gold belt with red loincloth.

2000s
In Premiere Productions' 2003 remake of Captain Barbell, Regine Velasquez made a cameo appearance as Darna. She wore a red and yellow one-piece costume (it looked like a gold-trimmed red bikini with the stomach part being yellow) with yellow stars, red helmet with white stone encrusted yellow winged medallion, white stone encrusted gold medallion belt with white loincloth, white stone encrusted gold bracelets, and red boots.

In Darna: The Ballet (2003), Kristine Crame and Kris Belle Paclibar who alternately played Darna wore the costume. There were two versions of the costume: (1) the traditional red bikini with gold stars, red helmet with gold winged medallion, red bracelet adorned with gold medallions, gold belt and loincloth, and red ballerina shoes adorned with gold medallions (the ballerina shoes looked like boots); and (2) red bra with gold dots surrounding the gold stars, yellow shorts, red helmet adorned with a seemingly large gold bird, red bracelets and belt both with gold embellishments, and red loincloth and boots.

Mango Comics 2003 miniseries/Angel Locsin's Darna look for the 2005 Darna TV series is also considered one of Darna's many 'official' costumes just as the original by Nestor Redondo is. Angel wore the same costume in a 2006 Robitussin LiquiGel TV advertisement.

In the 2005 TV series, Katrina Halili also wore a Darna costume as the villain Black Darna. As the name implies, her costume was similar to Darna but in all black and gold.

 Marian wore the traditional red bikini with gold stars but now gold-trimmed, gold-trimmed red helmet with the ruby encrusted gold winged medallion, gold bracelets and now with gold arm cuffs, golden medallion belt with gold-trimmed yellow loincloth in the middle, and gold-trimmed red knee-high stiletto boots. The gold wing detail on her helmet had a more angular shape. Darna is currently sporting this incarnation of the costume.

In the 2009 TV series, Rufa Mae Quinto played the character Francesca. She once wore a Darna costume. She had a red bandana with a gold diamond and red gem accent in the middle, gold cuff bracelets and armbands, red sequined brassiere cups with gold diamond details and transparent spaghetti straps, red bottoms, gold diamond-shaped medallion belt with red gem accent and yellow loincloth in the middle, and red mid-calf boots. Rufa Mae also played a super-heroine in the 2002 film Super-B; the title and the main character's name was in reference to Vilma Santos who previously played Darna on the big screen.

2010s
In the 2010 Sine Novela: Mars Ravelo's Trudis Liit television series (episode 37), Jillian Ward (who also played Captain Barbell's sidekick, Lelay/Super Tiny, in the 2011 Captain Barbell TV series) wore the traditional Darna costume while Pauleen Luna wore a Valentina costume similar to the one worn by Alessandra De Rossi in the 2005 Darna TV series. In a dream sequence, Jillian portrayed Darna and defeated Valentina portrayed by Pauleen. Marian Rivera, who previously played Darna in 2009, was also in this series as Odessa.

Marian Rivera donned her Darna costume once more for GMA at 60, the special presentation of GMA Network to celebrate their 60th anniversary in 2010. Stars of GMA Telebabad shows were featured along Marian's Darna. Marian also wore a red cape like Vilma Santos in Darna vs. the Planetwomen.

In other media

Darna films (1951-1994)

Darna in the 1950s
Over the years, Darna has appeared in many films. The superheroine's popularity skyrocketed in 1951, when Royal Films produced the first Darna film. Since then, a total of 14 films have been made portraying Darna and endless serialized stories in different comic books followed.

Two Darna films were made by Royal Films, both starring Rosa del Rosario in Darna (1951) and Darna at ang Babaing Lawin (1952). The film was a huge box-office success. The 1952 film was based on Darna at ang Babaing Lawin (Pilipino Komiks No.120 January 5, 1952). In Eric Cueto's interview with Rosa in the Official Mars Ravelo Darna website, she revealed that in her flying scenes in Darna, she was actually flying over Quiapo with the aid of a helicopter. She was suspended in the air with help of cables attached to her body and the helicopter. All her flying scenes were shot at night to hide the cables. She nearly crashed into Quiapo Church in one of her flying scenes.

Darna in the 1960s
In the early 1960s, two more Darna films were made, starring Liza Moreno as Darna with Danilo Jurado as Ding in Si Darna at ang Impakta (1963) produced by People's Pictures, Inc. It was very atmospheric and true to its comics serial roots. Darna's origin is once again retold on the big screen. The role of Roma was first played by Gina Alonzo who also played Lucy ang Babaeng Tuod in Si Darna at ang Babaing Tuod (1965) while Paquito Salcedo played the evil twin.

Liza Moreno starred again as Darna and was pitted against another superhero named Isputnik played by Nida Blanca.

In 1965, Cirio H. Santiago, who eventually became one of the most influential Filipino directors, directed the first Darna film produced in color. It was produced by People's Pictures Inc. Si Darna at ang Babaing Tuod was shown to the public—this time then-newcomer Eva Montes was tapped for the role. Eva also played Dyesebel's daughter, Alona, in the 1964 film Anak ni Dyesebel. This version was vastly different from Ravelo's original tale. This was also the only Darna film that focused more on the villain than on the hero; Darna appeared in the film only three times. In one of her later interviews, Eva revealed that this was because Gina Alonzo, who played the villain Lucilla, ang Babaing Tuod, was being groomed by People's Pictures, Inc. to be its next big star.

Gina Pareño portrayed the role in Vera Perez Productions' own version of Darna in Si Darna at ang Planetman (1969). In the film, Pareño played Darna and Daria, while Narda was played by the young Gina Alajar. Darna also fell in love for the first time in this film. She fell for a man who turned out to be the Planetman whom she had to defeat.

Darna in the 1970s and 1980s: Vilma's Darna
In the 1970s, films with Vilma Santos as Darna are iconic, influencing people's perception of the character some 30 years afterwards. In these films, Darna is already a teenager and she has to swallow the stone each time she transforms, as it comes out of her mouth whenever she changes back to Narda. Her home planet was not named. Lipad, Darna, Lipad! (1973) is the first and only trilogy of the superheroine. On March 23, 1973, Darna breaks all box-office record. It was the highest-grossing Darna film in Philippine film history and considered a turning point in Vilma's career. On the opening day of the film, the cast gave away free Darna dolls. Coca-Cola also promoted the film by giving away Darna characters mask. It was also the first Darna film where Darna and Narda were played by the same actress. Unfortunately, there is no existing copy left of this classic film. The line "Ding, ang bato!" ("Ding, [give me] the stone!") from the film Lipad, Darna, Lipad, became a favorite catchphrase, though it was not in the original komiks. The film had three episodes: (1) "Impakta" directed by Maning Borlaza. It starred Gloria Romero as Miss Luna, a school teacher with a dark secret. She is actually a flying flesh eater creature at night; (2) "Babaing Ahas" directed by Elwood Perez. It starred Celia Rodriguez as Valentina, a campy supermodel/gorgon. One scene has the actress naked in bed being caressed by a dozen snakes; and (3) "Babaing Lawin" (Hawk Woman) starring Liza Lorena as Babaing Lawin and Rod Dasco as Aguila directed by Joey Gosiengfiao.

Santos starred in three more Darna films: Darna and the Giants (1974)" and Darna vs. the Planet Women (1975) - both under Tagalog Ilang-Ilang Productions - and Darna and Ding (1980) with Niño Muhlach as Ding, under Muhlach's D'Wonder Films.

 Darna and the Giants (1974) was the continuation of Santos' first Darna film and Darna again wore the red and gold bikini costume. The giants were played by Divina Valencia and Ike Lozada. Helen Gamboa played the villainess Alien Warrior Queen X3X. Together with her alien minions, X3X terrorized Narda's village and captures several townsfolk and transforming them into mindless giants who go on a rampage across the countryside in the hopes of conquering Earth.
 Darna vs. the Planet Women (1975) rebooted Darna origins, with Narda portrayed as a crippled teenager who was given a magical stone by a mysterious source. The Planet Women, a band of bikini-clad space amazons who are each coded with a different shade of primary-hued body paint consisted of Noche, Elektra (played by Rossana Ortiz), come armed with a shopping list of Earth scientists whom they plan to abduct, setting stage for the most of the film's action, which involves Darna's efforts to thwart those abductions), Orang (played by Eva Linda), Maia and Kara.
 Darna and Ding (1980) was the final time Santos played Darna. For the first time, Ding was mentioned in the title. The film begins with a pre-credit sequence recounting Darna's origins. Apparently the notion of Darna's alter-ego having a bum leg, introduced in "Darna vs. the Planet Women", has since been abandoned. In this film, Darna is joined by Ding, who now has his own superpowers. Muhlach's Ding also becomes Darna in this film. Also, Lito Anzures' character stole the magic stone and transformed into Darna. Dr. Irene Vontesberg played by Marissa Delgado in an eye-flashing performance addressing a past injustice by raising the recently dead and setting them upon the villagers. This provides for a lot of creepy moments. Veronica Jones played Babaeng Lawin. As is typical of the series, the film shows Narda's tiny rural village to be the locus of every imaginable kind of extraterrestrial, criminal and paranormal activity—and shambling, green slime slobbering ghouls. Santos displayed her faux kung fu skills, but then it takes a darker turn, with one of the cons gunning down an innocent bystander. Much as with Dr. Vontesberg, there seems to be a tragic dimension to Lei Ming, as she follows many of her acts of evil with extended crying jags. Darna and Ding's final episode sees the pair following a trail of missing children to the doorstep of Lei Ming, an evil Chinese sorceress played—in a yet another eye-flashing performance by Celia Rodriguez.

Darna in the 1970s: the male Darnas
Chiquito was the first male Darna in Philippine films. In Vilma Santos' film Terribol Dobol (1974), he played the superhero in a short scene. He was considered the arch-rival of Comedy King, Dolphy, who later on also played Darna and Captain Barbell.

In 1979, Regal Films produced a parody of the Darna films titled Darna, Kuno?. In this film, there were actually three Darnas: Dolphy, Brenda del Rio and Lotis Key. Del Rio's part was first offered to Vilma Santos. The story is about a poor underdog man Dondoy (Dolphy). The real Darna (Brenda del Rio) became pregnant by Japanese anime robots Mazinger Z and Voltes V. Darna lends Dondoy her magical stone and will reclaim it as after as she gives birth. In order for Dondoy to turn into Darna, he has to swallow the stone and shout "Darna, Kuno" and for him to return to his human form, he has to shout "Darna, lekba!" (a verlan backslang metathesis of the Tagalog word balik, which means "return"). Darna Kuno also encountered different kinds of Filipino folklore characters like the tikbalang (half-man and half-horse creatures), the aswang and others. Annabel (Lotis Key) also put on the Darna costume without the sash. She discovers Darna Kuno's secret identity and stole the magical stone. At the end of the film, Darna Kuno and Annabel battled a group of aliens and defeated them. The real Darna returns with her baby, also dressed up as Darna, and took back her stone. The baby also seemed to have powers as the little one was seen flying with Darna.

A few months after Dolphy's Darna parody, MBM Productions presented its own Darna film, Bira, Darna, Bira! starring 18 year-old Rio Locsin (who also made an appearance in the parody). This is the only Darna film that did not do well in box-office. Narda also became a high-class model in this film.

Darna in the 1990s
Viva Films produced Darna (1991), and was directed by Joel Lamangan. Half-Russian, half-Filipina actress Nanette Medved played Darna. Then nine-year-old Francine Prieto (under her real name Anna Marie Falcon; she also starred in the 2009 Darna TV series as Babaeng Tuod) played the young Narda. Nanette portrayed Narda as a model working in Manila and Darna with reference to Wonder Woman's ability to block bullets with her bracelets. This started the criticism that Darna was a Wonder Woman rip-off. Darna's costume was also altered in this film. From the helmet Darna used to wear in past films, she now wore a tiara with wings. She had two brothers in this film, Ding and Dong.

After appearing in a TV commercial for an automobile company as Darna (with fellow beauty queens Alma Concepcion and Daisy Reyes, both also wearing Darna costumes), Filipina-American and dethroned Bb. Pilipinas-Universe 1991 Anjanette Abayari was chosen by Viva Films to play its second Darna film, Mars Ravelo's Darna! Ang Pagbabalik (1994). Although the grandmother was named Lola Asay in the early versions of the comics serial, she wasn't named in the previous film. Abayari appeared again as Darna in a cameo in Ang Pagbabalik ni Pedro Penduko (1994) starring Janno Gibbs.

Cameos and abandoned projects
In a cameo role of Viva Films' Captain Barbell (1986) starring Herbert Bautista and Edu Manzano, Sharon Cuneta appeared as Darna. It was supposed to be Cuneta's promotion for her own full-length Darna film. However, she declined the project later due to the excessive requirements of the role. Back then, there were no invisible wires to lift Darna in the air, so an actress would need to lie down, head first, while a long piece of iron would hold her tight on both sides of her body.

In the 2003 film Captain Barbell by Premiere Entertainment Productions starring Ogie Alcasid and Bong Revilla, Regine Velasquez made a cameo appearance in a dream sequence as Darna which she reprised in her concert tour "The Singer and the Songwriter" the following year. Like Cuneta, Velasquez was supposed to portray Darna in her own full-length film but it was cancelled as well.

In 2012, Darna's action sequences from Darna vs. the Planet Women (1975) were shown side-by-side comedian Vice Ganda's Darna-inspired action scenes in the comedy film, This Guy's in Love with U Mare!, directed by Wenn Deramas. Vilma Santos' son, Luis Manzano, also stars in the film.

Darna TV series

1977 TV series
The comic book superheroine also found its way to the small screen. The first Darna TV series was created by Kitchie Benedicto and starred a 14-year-old Lorna Tolentino as Darna/Narda. It was aired on KBS 9 (RPN 9).

2005 TV series

In 2005, GMA Network tapped Angel Locsin to play Darna after the success of the TV series Mulawin where she played one of the lead roles. Locsin had to learn wushu, kung fu and other fighting techniques even as she mastered the art of flying and display Darna's superpowers. A lot of changes and new material were added for this incarnation of Darna. The show follows the original version's storyline with Narda finding the stone as a child, but she only becomes Darna and discovers her powers at age eighteen. Many new allies and enemies were invented for the show, as well as more backstory. Notably, Narda and Valentina are half-sisters while Ding has been killed. In the story, the Black Darna is a result of Narda's release of all her pent-up emotions. Another Mars Ravelo's creation "Dyesebel" (portrayed by Ara Mina) made a guest appearance in the series for the very first time.

Four actresses who previously played Darna were involved in the 2005 TV series:
Gina Pareño (Darna and the Planetman, 1969) appeared as Darna's grandmother.
Rio Locsin (Bira, Darna, Bira, 1979) appeared as the wife of Dr. Zombie, one of the villains.
Lorna Tolentino (Darna in 1977 TV series) portrayed Queen Adran of Marte.
Regine Velasquez (Darna in the 2003 film Captain Barbell) sang the theme song of the series, "Di Na Nag-iisa" (composed by Jay Durias of South Border). She also provided the voice clip of shouting "Darna!" for use in the TV series.

In the final episode, Captain Barbell makes a cameo appearance. It was done to tease the then-upcoming Captain Barbell TV series. Captain Barbell's face was not shown, only his "CB" chest insignia, as the role was not yet cast.

2009 TV series

After the success of the 2005 series, GMA Network confirmed that it still held the rights of Darna, along with Captain Barbell and Dyesebel. In January 2008, it was announced that GMA Network decided to make another Darna series but this time, it will be along with Captain Barbell. But due to schedule conflicts of Richard Gutierrez, the plan was shelved. Also, Locsin already transferred to rival station ABS-CBN in 2007.

GMA Network, along with the Darna copyright holders, unanimously chose Marian Rivera as Darna. It was announced by Wilma Galvante, GMA Network's SVP for Entertainment TV, in an interview that the new Darna should be a real star because it is a prime role. Mark Herras was considered for the lead male role of Eduardo, but Mark Anthony Fernandez won the part. Regine Velasquez (who previously portrayed Darna in the film Captain Barbell in 2003) was again involved in the series. Like the 2005 TV series, she also provided the voice clip of shouting "Darna!", and later played a villain called Elektra, the Planet Woman in the 2nd season.

GMA Network announced that the new Darna would be a mirror to Marian Rivera's personality, possibly featuring more comedy flavor into the drama plot. Rivera is best known for her roles as the leads in the Philippine adaptation of MariMar and another Mars Ravelo creation, Dyesebel. Rivera underwent rigid physical and mental training for the role and also began to train in wushu. She was about to start her fighting routines with an expert and also to be trained on harness. Unfortunately, it was postponed due to conflicts on schedule. Also, Galvante confirmed that Captain Barbell, another Mars Ravelo creation, is going to be shown in the series. However, it did not push through, so a new character named Pancho (Narda's childhood friend from orphanage and love interest played by Dennis Trillo) was introduced instead.

The rebooted Darna TV series directed by Dominic Zapata and Don Michael Perez premiered on August 10, 2009. Rivera soared high as Darna. The series' 44.1% pilot rating is Rivera's second-highest primetime-series opening, after Dyesebel's 44.9%. But it cannot be denied that Locsin's Darna made history when it reached 52.1% on its fourth episode, where she appeared in a Darna costume for the first time. It was the highest rating achieved by any GMA Network show at that time.

2022 TV series

On December 4, Jane De Leon signed an exclusive contract with ABS-CBN’s Star Magic a which made the announcement that she will star in the TV series called Mars Ravelo’s Darna: The TV Series. Now it has been titled as Mars Ravelo’s Darna.

Iza Calzado, who was once offered to do the role sometime in 2005 but was withdrawn and gave it to Angel Locsin, played the role in a single episode. She is referred as the Unang Darna (First Darna) who will pass the stone to her daughter Narda played by de Leon.

Darna Lives! webcomic

In 2011, comic book creators Gerry Alanguilan and Arnold Arre partnered to write a 9-page concept webcomic called Darna Lives! which reimagined the life of Darna. Alanguilan wrote the story and Arre provided the art for the piece, which portrayed Darna's alter-ego Narda having forgotten her superhero identity and moved on to a life of obscurity and poverty, until fate intervenes to bring Darna back. Although short, the fan-fiction was notable for its significantly different portrayal of the character, since it was the first time the Narda alter-ego was portrayed as anything but a demure young woman.; Narda is married and has three children.

Commenting on the work in a Philippine Daily Inquirer interview, Alanguilan explained his motivations for coming out with the story:"I think Arnold and I were able to show that Darna, as a character, can stand to be interpreted differently to allow her to remain appealing and relevant to a new audience. I hope Darna Lives! can push for this kind of change. I think Filipinos, as we have seen, are open too it, and comics creators and filmmakers do not need to keep relying on old tricks and gimmicks that have worked before. I hope it can push our storytellers in other media, especially TV and movies to be bolder. 'Di mage-gets ng masa yan' ('The masses won't understand that') is a stupid, cowardly statement that ensures nothing but stagnancy."

Song in a story depiction
"Kahit Man Lang Sa Pangarap" (1991)
Performed by: Vina Morales (1991 Movie OST)
"Hindi Ako si Darna" (1998)
Filipino version of "Superwoman" popularized by Karyn White
Performed by: Jenine Desiderio
"Narda" (2005)
Composed and Performed by: Kamikazee (2009 TV series OST)
"Mamaw" (2005)
Performed by Michael V. (2009 TV series OST)
"Time In" (2007)
Performed by: Yeng Constantino
"Di Na Nag-iisa" (2005)
Performed by Regine Velasquez - Love theme from the 2005 Darna television series. This song was officially released by Universal Records in Regine Velasquez' Motion Picture Soundtrack, "Till I Met You". A 2nd version of "Di Na Nag-Iisa"(Acoustic version) appears on this same album.
Jona Viray also covered the song for her debut studio album, On My Own under the title 'Di Na Mag-iisa'.
"Di Na Magigisa" (2005)
Performed by Michael V.
"Darna, Ikaw Na" (2020)
Performed by Daryl Ong
"Patuloy Lang Ang Lipad" (2022)
Performed by BGYO (2022 TV Series OST)
"'Di Maghihiwalay" (2022)
Performed by LA Santos (2022 TV Series OST)
"Lipad" (2022)
Performed by Young JV (2022 TV Series OST)

Television commercials
The character of Darna was used in a series of Toyota Tamaraw FX commercials, with Anjanette Abayari, Alma Concepcion, and Daisy Reyes portraying Darna in 1997.

Angel Locsin also appeared as Darna in a 2006 Robitussin LiquiGel TV advertisement wearing her Darna costume from the 2005 TV series. It was directed by Avid Liongoren. The story started with a giant monster attacking a village. Narda was about to transform into Darna but was interrupted by her cough so she shouted only half of the name (Dar...). She was then seen holding a LiquiGel capsule which she swallowed to transform into Darna. She rescued some bystander first before defeating the giant monster to death.

Theater

Ballet
Darna has also been portrayed in several ballet productions by Ballet Philippines (BP) and Philippine Ballet Theatre (PBT).

Pilipino Komiks
On April 22–25, 1993, prima ballerina Lisa Macuja-Elizalde played Darna and Melanie Motus played Valentina in the musical stage play entitled Pilipino Komiks with Maritoni Tordesillas as Dyesebel and Noreen Austria as Bangenge; Katrina Santos; Osias Barroso as Dario; Raoul Banzon as Gorio; Cathy Lee as Rita; and Robert Policarpio as Ipe. This ballet stage production was presented by Philippine Ballet Theatre and featured comic book characters made by Mars Ravelo, including Darna, Valentina, Dyesebel, Rita Rich, Ipe and Bangenge, in a comedic way. Chino Toledo's music, Gener Caringal's choreography, Arturo' set and costume designs, and lighting by Eric Cruz brought comics to life on the stage.

After 24 years, this dance story of the battle between good and evil that was first choreographed by former PBT director Gener Caringal was re-staged again on May 14, 2017, by Philippine Ballet Theatre and co-presented by Filipino Heritage Festival, National Commission for Culture and the Arts, AB Leisure and Philippine Amusement and Gaming Corporation (PAGCOR) in celebration of Heritage Month. In this re-staging of Pilipino Komiks, Regine Magbitang played Narda/Darna while Loby Pimentel played Valentina; Peter San Juan as Narda's boyfriend, Dario; Veronica Atienza as Dyesebel; Kim Abrogena as Bangenge; Mark Pineda as Gorio; Marika Desembrana as Rita; and Matthew Davo as Ipe. Both plays were performed in the Cultural Center of the Philippines (CCP) Main Theater; the second play was additionally performed in Negros, Philippines.

Comics: The Ballet
In 1997, Lisa Macuja-Elizalde danced the part of Darna in Comics: The Ballet in celebration of Darna's golden anniversary.

Darna: The Ballet
Another ballet stage play was produced on August 1–17, 2003 by Ballet Philippines and presented at the Cultural Center of the Philippines. In this theater version, entitled Darna: The Ballet, Christine Crame and Kris-Belle Paclibar alternately danced the part of Darna while Valentina did the singing.

This action-packed dance-musical production is equally focused on both Darna and Valentina.

Other stage plays

Ding, Ang Bato!
On May 14 to 21, 2018, Ding, Ang Bato! that was presented by the Arts and Culture Cluster and the Dance Program of the School of Design and Arts of the De La Salle–College of Saint Benilde was a dance musical theatre that once more featured Darna and Valentina. Staged at School of Design and Arts (SDA) Theater at De La Salle College of St. Benilde on Pablo Ocampo St. and directed also by Chris Millardo, the story is told from the point-of-view of Ding (played alternately by Carlos Serrano, Juner Quiambao and John Peñaranda), the younger brother of Narda, who is born deaf in this version and accompanies Darna in the journey of empowerment.

The production reunited the team with Benilde's Dance Chair Christine Crame who deftly reprised the role of Darna from the production that first saw 'flight' at the Cultural Center of the Philippines Main Theater in 2003 and is now devised for contemporary audiences. Stage and TV actor Natasha Cabrera inhabits the role of Valentina. Olivia Bugayong alternates with Crame for Darna while Dani Idea alternates for Valentina. In this version, Valentina is a sympathetic character and has an alter-ego named Tina that was played by Lea Roque.
 
In this dance musical redux of "Darna", the quintessential Filipina super heroine grapples with the irascible serpent queen Valentina who used to be her childhood friend. Darna's encounter with Valentina flung the two friends, now arch-enemies, into fantastic realms of urban dystopia that make them confront their brightest and darkest selves. Choreographed by Denisa Reyes and Ernest Mandap, Filipino Sign Language was seamlessly interwoven into the choreography. In fact, the whole production used sign language and spoken dialog without the necessity of an interpreter so that both hearing and deaf audiences could experience the narrative.

Art and literature
Darna Komiks is a comic book series first published by Pilipino Komiks, Inc. and continued by Atlas Publishing Co., Inc. Its maiden issue appeared on February 3, 1968, with Ruben R. Marcelino as editor.

In children's literature, Edgar Samar wrote a story entitled "Uuwi na ang Nanay kong si Darna" which won the PBBY-Salanga Writer's Prize in 2002 and was illustrated by Russell Molina, who won the PBBY Illustrator's Prize.

In 2012, Anvil Publishing, Inc. published Darna & Other Idols by Marra P. L. Lanot with Marian Rivera as Darna on the cover. The book features former Darna actresses Marian Rivera and Vilma Santos, and Gina Alajar who played Narda in Si Darna at ang Planetman (1969).

Postage stamps
Darna has also been the subject of a series of national postage stamps released by PhilPost on November 15, 2004. The Darna issue 3 cover that Gilbert Monsanto did for Mango Comics and Nestor Redondo's Darna were among those featured along with Francisco Reyes' Kulafu, Francisco V. Coching's Lapu-Lapu, and Federico Javinal and Coching's El Vibora.

Recurring Stars

Merchandising

Funko Pop!
The Darna x Funko Pop! vinyl figurine was first announced on the second day of ToyCon 2019 on June 29, 2019, at the SMX Convention Center in Pasay in a panel celebrating Darna's 70th anniversary. On July 25, 2019, ABS-CBN, the media company producing the new Darna movie, announced that the figurine by US-based toy manufacturer Funko will be exclusively available in the Philippines during Fun Con 2019 through Big Boys Toy Store from August 2 to 4, 2019.

Darna is the first-ever Filipino superhero to have this most sought-after licensed pop culture collectible. Funko replicated Darna's trademark look created by artist Nestor Redondo, complete with a red helmet that has a gold winged medallion to match her iconic two-piece red bikini that has gold stars on each brassiere cap; gold cuff bracelets; a gold medallion belt with a white loincloth in the middle; and red knee-high boots with golden lining. The Funko Darna launch comes nearly a month after Jane De Leon was announced as the lead for Star Cinema's movie on the superhero. ABS-CBN even had the new Darna, Jane De Leon, do a Funko Pop! unboxing video of the superhero. Darna Funko Pop!—under the heading, Ravelo Komiks Universe, listed as No. 23 in Funko Pop Comics— was released alongside a glow-in-the-dark edition of the barong-wearing Jollibee Funko Pop! in time for the Philippine Independence Day celebration in June.

Aside from the Darna Funko Pop! toy, other Darna collectibles are also available such as the Darna Card Game, statuettes, shirts, and other novelty items.

On-screen actresses and actors
Rosa del Rosario was the first actress to play the first Filipino superheroine on screen. Vilma Santos and Marian Rivera are the only two actresses who played two of Mars Ravelo's komiks characters respectively, namely Darna and Dyesebel with Vilma having played Darna four times.

Official list of actresses and actors who played Darna

Others
Chiquito in Terribol Dobol (1974) as a male Darna
Dolphy in Darna, Kuno? (1979) as a male Darna
Brenda del Rio in Darna, Kuno? (1979)
Lotis Key in Darna, Kuno? (1979)
Niño Muhlach in Darna and Ding (1980) as Narda's brother Ding who temporarily became a male Darna
Katrina Halili in Mars Ravelo's Darna (2005 TV series) as Black Darna
Angel Aquino in Mars Ravelo's Darna (2009 TV series) as the original Darna and keeper of the white stone

Tetchie Agbayani and Kim Molina in Hindi Ako Si Darna (2017 theatre play)
Janella Salvador in Mars Ravelo's Darna (2022 TV series) as Green Darna

Official list of actors who played Ding
Darna's adventures won't be complete without her sidekick Ding.

21st century Darna

Darna under GMA Network
According to a news article in September 2004, GMA's Film division planned to produce a Darna film in addition to the 2005 TV series. Wilma Galvez of GMA 7 wanted a different actress for the film version and had reportedly offered the role to Regine Velasquez who previously portrayed Darna in "Captain Barbell" (2003). However, the production of the project did not come to fruition.

But due to schedule conflicts of Richard Gutierrez who was busy with other projects, everything was shelved. Also, Angel Locsin has already transferred to the rival network ABS-CBN in 2007. It didn't materialize as well.

Darna under ABS-CBN

In 2013, the Ravelo family gave ABS-CBN the rights to the characters created by Mars Ravelo. ABS-CBN officially acquired the exclusive rights to 13 Mars Ravelo titles including Dyesebel, Darna, and Captain Barbell. A Darna film was first announced in 2013 by Star Cinema, and Erik Matti was revealed to direct the film. In October 2013, Star Cinema managing director Malou Santos confirmed that Angel Locsin, who portrayed Darna in the 2005 GMA teleserye, would be reprising the role in the upcoming Darna film to be produced by ABS-CBN and Reality Entertainment, five months after the network acquired the rights to Darna and 12 other Ravelo characters. During an interview with ABS-CBN, Locsin said that the yet untitled Darna film was one of the biggest projects ever done by the film company.

Two years later, Locsin pulled out of the Darna film project. On October 26, 2015, Locsin stated on her Instagram account that she could no longer play Darna. According to a press statement from ABS-CBN, the actress was dealing with health concerns. On the photo posted on The Rodmagaru Show, it is confirmed that Darna has continued in production. Locsin developed a disc bulge in her spine and was soon considered a minor handicap because of her injury; as a result she chose to leave the project.

Locsin also clarified on her Instagram account that ABS-CBN had already chosen another actress for the role of Darna, but did not reveal her name. On an interview with Spot.ph, Matti said that they have already found an actress for the role but still it isn't final. On September 1, on a dinner get-together hosted by ABS-CBN President and CEO Carlo Katigbak for the officer and members of Professional Artist Managers, Inc. (PAMI) and with other business unit heads of ABS-CBN network, Malou Santos officially confirmed that Locsin will reprise her role as Darna. ABS-CBN executives had been eyeing Locsin to reprise the role as they could not find any other suitable actress to replace her. Thus, they waited until Locsin was fully healed and given clearance for the role. However, in March 2017, Locsin stated that she will be unable to play the title role and dropped out of the project due to health and safety reasons. Meanwhile, twelve actresses were considered as replacements for Locsin. Such included the likes of Liza Soberano, Nadine Lustre, Julia Montes, Sarah Geronimo, Maja Salvador, Pia Wurtzbach, Arci Muñoz, Jessy Mendiola, KC Concepcion, Yassi Pressman, Anne Curtis, Kathryn Bernardo and Ritz Azul. In May 2017, it was announced that Liza Soberano will replace Locsin. But, in April 2019, Soberano withdrew from the project due to a finger bone injury she acquired during production for the network's 2018 TV series Bagani. Meanwhile, ABS-CBN had begun casting on a new actress.

In July 2019, it was announced that Jane de Leon would replace Soberano. In August 2020, ABS-CBN announced to postponement of the filming of the movie due to concerns over the COVID-19 pandemic and the restrictions. However, in December 2020, ABS-CBN announced the Darna film will be adapted into a television series.

Collected editions

See also
Mary Marvel
Supergirl
Superman
Wonder Woman
Isis (DC Comics)

References

External links

Official Mars Ravelo's Darna web site
Mars Ravelo Superheroes web site
Darna at the International Catalogue of Superheroes
Mango Comics
Darna 2005 TV series
Darna 2009 TV series
Darna at Philippine Comics - The most comprehensive library of Filipino comics on the internet.

 
1950 comics debuts
Comics about women
Comics adapted into television series
Comics characters introduced in 1950
Comics characters who can move at superhuman speeds
Comics characters with superhuman strength
Female characters in comics
Female superheroes
Extraterrestrial characters in comics
Filipino superheroes
Philippine comics adapted into films
Philippine comics titles